Mosquito Township is one of seventeen townships in Christian County, Illinois, USA.  As of the 2020 census, its population was 346 and it contained 160 housing units.

Geography

Unincorporated towns
 Osbernville at

Cemeteries
The township contains these four cemeteries: Berea Christian, Darmer, Hunter and Stafford.

Airports and landing strips
 McCoy Airport
 Noland RLA Airport

Demographics
As of the 2020 census there were 346 people, 81 households, and 64 families residing in the township. The racial makeup of the township was 92.20% White, 0.00% African American, 0.29% Native American, 0.29% Asian, 0.00% Pacific Islander, 1.16% from other races, and 6.07% from two or more races. Hispanic or Latino of any race were 4.34% of the population.

There were 81 households, out of which 38.30% had children under the age of 18 living with them, 79.01% were married couples living together, none had a female householder with no spouse present, and 20.99% were non-families. 21.00% of all households were made up of individuals, and 11.10% had someone living alone who was 65 years of age or older. The average household size was 2.23 and the average family size was 2.56.

The township's age distribution consisted of 19.9% under the age of 18, none from 18 to 24, 33.1% from 25 to 44, 23.2% from 45 to 64, and 23.8% who were 65 years of age or older. The median age was 44.2 years. For every 100 females, there were 96.7 males. For every 100 females age 18 and over, there were 74.7 males.

The median income for a household in the township was $69,028, and the median income for a family was $73,889. Males had a median income of $67,955 versus $23,684 for females. The per capita income for the township was $30,259. None of the population was below the poverty line.

School districts
 Meridian Community Unit School District 15
 Sangamon Valley Community Unit School District 9
 Taylorville Community Unit School District 3

Political districts
 State House District 87
 State Senate District 44

References
 
 United States Census Bureau 2009 TIGER/Line Shapefiles
 United States National Atlas

External links
 City-Data.com
 Illinois State Archives
 Township Officials of Illinois

Townships in Christian County, Illinois
Townships in Illinois